Clive Scott is a professor of European Literature at the University of East Anglia and the author of many ground-breaking books on French poetry.

Scott's book Channel Crossings: French and English Poetry in Dialogue 1550-2000 (Legenda, 2002) was awarded the 2003 R. H. Gapper Book Prize by the UK Society for French Studies. This prize recognises the work as the best book published by a scholar working in Britain or Ireland in French studies in 2002.

Scott became a fellow of the British Academy in 1994.

Publications
 The Poetics of French Verse: Studies in Reading (Oxford: Clarendon Press, 1998);
 The Spoken Image: Photography and Language (London: Reaktion Books, 1999);
 Translating Baudelaire (Exeter; Exeter Univ. Press, 2000).
 Channel Crossings: French and English Poetry in Dialogue 1550-2000 (Oxford: Legenda, 2002)
 A Question of Syllables: Essays in Nineteenth-Century French Verse (Cambridge University Press, 2005)
 French verse-art: A Study (Cambridge University Press, 2011)
 Literary Translation and the Rediscovery of Reading (Cambridge University Press, 2015)

References

English literary critics
Literary critics of French
Academics of the University of East Anglia
Living people
Fellows of the British Academy
Year of birth missing (living people)